Romance-speaking Africa or Latin Africa consists of the countries and territories in Africa whose official or main languages are Romance ones, and countries which have significant populations that speak Romance languages: French, Portuguese, Spanish, and Italian.

Many of these countries are members of the Organisation internationale de la Francophonie (OIF; International Organization of La Francophonie) or the Community of Portuguese Language Countries (Comunidade dos Países de Língua Portuguesa), and seven are members of the Latin Union.

North Africa, from Morocco to Egypt, was part of the Roman Empire. As a result, the African Romance language evolved in Tunisia, Algeria and Morocco. It was spoken until the 13th century.

French language

The following is a list of the Sub-Saharan African countries where French or African French is spoken.
, French language in Benin
, French language in Burundi
, French language in Burkina Faso 
, French language in the Central African Republic 
, French language in Chad
, French language in Cameroon
, French language in Comorosi
, French language in Cote d'Ivoire
, French language in the Democratic Republic of the Congo
, French language in the Republic of the Congo 
, French language in Djibouti 
, French language in Gabon
, French language in Guinea
, French language in Madagascar
, French language in Mali
, French language in Mauritania
, French language in Mauritius
, French language in Niger
, French language in Rwanda
, French language in Senegal
, French language in Seychelles 
, French language in Togo

The French Language is also spoken in two French Overseas Departments:
, French language in Mayotte
, French language in Reunion

Portuguese language

African countries where Portuguese (African Portuguese varieties) is spoken:
, Angolan Portuguese
, Cape Verdean Portuguese
, Guinean Portuguese
, Mozambican Portuguese
, São Tomean Portuguese

Portuguese territory, geographically located in Africa, where Portuguese is spoken

 Portugal: Madeira Archipelago

Spanish language
Sub-Saharan African countries where Spanish is spoken:
, Spanish language in Equatorial Guinea (French is also official. Portuguese may or may not be in the process of becoming the third official language)

Spain territories in Africa (official language):
: the Canary Islands, Ceuta and Melilla

Romance languages in North Africa
In North Africa there are countries where French, Spanish or Italian are spoken, but they are neither the main nor the official languages:
, Maghreb French 
, Spanish is often spoken as a second language in the former Spanish protectorate, but the French language is the national second language since the French protectorate was much larger. Haketia (or Western Judaeo-Spanish) is spoken by a few hundreds of Moroccan Jews and is endangered. Another variant, the Spanish language that was spoken by moriscos, is extinct.
, Maghreb French is widely spoken. A small part of the population speaks also Italian.
, Spanish language in Western Sahara.

Italian language
Somalia had Italian as its cultural language in universities up to 1991; however, the Italian language remains unknown to over 95% of the population. In Libya, Italians were forced to leave the country after its independence. The presence of Italian is limited in Ethiopia as Italian rule lasted only 5 years from 1936 to 1941. 

In all of these countries, the only one that preserves Italian is Eritrea, which has only one Italian-language school remaining, with 470 pupils yearly. The name of the only Italian-language school in Eritrea is Scuola Italiana di Asmara. Somalia once decreed that the republic's official languages would be the (Maay and Maxaatiri) registers of Somali  as well as Arabic, deleting Italian's official status.

Italian islands geographically in Africa (official language):
: Lampedusa and Pantelleria.

See also
List of Latin place names in Africa
United States of Latin Africa
African Romance

References

Country classifications